The National Hockey League is one of the top attended professional sports in the world, as well as one of the top two attended indoor sports in both average and total attendance. As of the 2018–19 season the NHL averaged 18,250 live spectators per game, and 22,002,081 total for the season.

Leader 

 *** Attendance capacity partially reduced due to government Covid-19 restrictions

2021-22 attendance statistics 

 *** Attendance capacity partially reduced due to government Covid-19 restrictions

2019–20 attendance statistics

2018–19 attendance statistics

Notes
 The New York Islanders move half of their home schedule to their former arena, Nassau Coliseum, while continuing to play half their home games at Barclays Center.
 The Scottrade Center was renamed Enterprise Center.
 The Air Canada Centre was renamed Scotiabank Arena.
 Totals do not include two outdoor regular-season and international games.
 The Chicago Blackhawks hosted the Boston Bruins during the 2019 NHL Winter Classic, played at Notre Dame Stadium in Notre Dame, Indiana, on January 1, 2019.
 The Philadelphia Flyers hosted the Pittsburgh Penguins during the 2019 NHL Stadium Series, played at Lincoln Financial Field in Philadelphia on February 23, 2019.
 For the 2018 NHL Global Series, the New Jersey Devils and Edmonton Oilers played at the Scandinavium in Gothenburg, Sweden on October 6, 2018, with New Jersey acting as the home team for the game.
 For the 2018 NHL Global Series, the Florida Panthers and Winnipeg Jets played two games at Hartwall Arena in Helsinki, Finland on November 1 and 2, 2018, with both teams splitting the hosting duties as the home team.

2017–18 attendance statistics

Notes
 The Vegas Golden Knights began their inaugural season at T-Mobile Arena in Paradise, Nevada during the 2017-18 season.
 The Detroit Red Wings began play at Little Caesars Arena during the season.
 The Verizon Center was renamed Capital One Arena
 The MTS Centre was renamed Bell MTS Place
 Totals do not include three outdoor regular season games.
 The Ottawa Senators hosted the Montreal Canadiens during the NHL 100 Classic, played at TD Place Stadium in Lansdowne Park, Ottawa, on December 16, 2017.
 The Buffalo Sabres and New York Rangers played during the 2018 NHL Winter Classic, played at Citi Field in Queens, New York, on January 1, 2018.
 The Washington Capitals hosted the Toronto Maple Leafs during the 2018 NHL Stadium Series, played at Navy-Marine Corps Memorial Stadium in Annapolis, Maryland on March 3, 2018.

2016–17 attendance statistics

Notes:
 The Detroit Red Wings will move to Little Caesars Arena for the 2017–18 season.

2015–16 attendance statistics

Notes:
 The New York Islanders moved from Nassau Coliseum to Barclays Center in Brooklyn, New York.
 Totals do not include three outdoor regular season games. 
 The Boston Bruins played the Montreal Canadiens outdoors in the Winter Classic at Gillette Stadium in Foxborough, Massachusetts.
 The Minnesota Wild played the Chicago Blackhawks outdoors in the 2016 NHL Stadium Series at TCF Bank Stadium in Minneapolis, Minnesota.
 The Colorado Avalanche played the Detroit Red Wings outdoors in the 2016 NHL Stadium Series at Coors Field in Denver, Colorado.
 The Edmonton Oilers will move to Rogers Place the following season.

2014–15 attendance statistics

Notes:
 Totals do not include two outdoor regular season games. 
 The Washington Capitals played the Chicago Blackhawks outdoors in the Winter Classic at Nationals Park in Washington, D.C.
 The San Jose Sharks hosted the 2015 NHL Stadium Series at Levi's Stadium in Santa Clara, California, against the Los Angeles Kings.
 Jobing.com Arena renamed Gila River Arena.

2013–14 attendance statistics

Notes:
 Totals include six outdoor regular season games. 
 The Detroit Red Wings played the Toronto Maple Leafs outdoors in the Winter Classic at Michigan Stadium in Ann Arbor, Michigan
 The inaugural NHL Stadium Series had four games: Anaheim Ducks versus Los Angeles Kings at Los Angeles' Dodger Stadium, Pittsburgh Penguins versus Chicago Blackhawks at Chicago's Soldier Field, and two games at Yankee Stadium, with the New York Rangers playing visitor to both the New Jersey Devils and the New York Islanders.
 The Vancouver Canucks played the Ottawa Senators outdoors in the NHL Heritage Classic at BC Place, in Vancouver, British Columbia.

2012–13 attendance statistics

2011–12 attendance statistics

Notes:
 Totals do not include four regular-season opening games played in Europe, and one outdoor regular season games. 
 The Buffalo Sabres played one home game against the Anaheim Ducks at Hartwall Areena in Helsinki, Finland.
 The Anaheim Ducks played one home game against the New York Rangers at the Ericsson Globe in Stockholm, Sweden.
 The Los Angeles Kings played two home games, one against the New York Rangers at Ericsson Globe in Stockholm, Sweden, and one against the Buffalo Sabres at O2 World in Berlin, Germany.
 The Philadelphia Flyers played the New York Rangers outdoors in the Winter Classic at Citizens Bank Park in Philadelphia, Pennsylvania.

See also
List of sports attendance figures

References

Attendance
National Hockey League